Dennis Courtland Hayes (born January 29, 1951) was General Counsel as well as the interim President and CEO of the National Association for the Advancement of Colored People in 2005 and from 2007 to 2008. During his time as interim CEO, Hayes criticized President George W. Bush's Social Security reform proposals and Major League Baseball's recruitment efforts of black baseball players.

References

External links

Living people
1951 births
People from Indianapolis
Indiana University alumni